Mill Spring Creek is a small stream in Wayne County in the U.S. state of Missouri. It is a tributary of the Black River.

Mill Spring Creek was named for the fact it was fed by a spring which powered a watermill.

See also
List of rivers of Missouri

References

Rivers of Wayne County, Missouri
Rivers of Missouri
Tributaries of the Black River (Arkansas–Missouri)